The Herts Charity Cup, officially titled the Hertfordshire Football Association Charity Cup, was begun in the 1900-01 season as a fund raising competition for the chosen charities of the Hertfordshire County Football Association. It is second only in status to the Herts Senior Cup within the competitions run by the Herts FA and is the third longest running, following the Herts Senior Cup (1886-87) and the Herts Junior Cup (1894-95). The charity aspect of the competition is still maintained with the Herts FA donating £525 from the 2008-09 competition to various chosen football-connected charities such as the St Johns Ambulance Brigade and Disability Sport England.

It is currently contested by the eight senior clubs in the county, outside the Football League (for this reason, Watford and now Barnet, do enter). The eight clubs who entered in the 2008-09 season were Bishop's Stortford and St Albans City (Football Conference), Ware, Cheshunt, Potters Bar Town and Hitchin Town (Isthmian League), Hemel Hempstead Town (Southern League) and the now defunct Berkhamsted Town (Spartan South Midlands League).

Potters Bar Town also play in the Middlesex Senior Cup, because Potters Bar was historically in Middlesex, and the club is affiliated to both the Hertfordshire and the Middlesex County Football Association.

Results

KEY * extra time, x Hitchin retain trophy as holders, # St Albans refused to accept date for final. Cheshunt awarded cup,  ~ St Albans again refused to accept date for final. Cheshunt awarded cup. $ Hemel withdrew from the competition because of player safety concerns, Hitchin awarded cup.

Results by team

References 

County Cup competitions
Sport in Hertfordshire
Recurring events established in 1901